Baspani or Banspani may refer to a number of populated places:

India 
 Baspani, Betul District , in Betul District, Madhya Pradesh

Nepal 

 Baspani, Dhankuta District 
 Baspani, Mahalaxmi, Dhankuta District 
 Baspani, Dolakha District 
 Baspani, Dhangadi, Kailali District 
 Baspani, Mohanyal, Kailali District 
 Baspani, Khotang District 
 Baspani, Makwanpur District 
 Baspani, Nukawot District 
 Baspani, Pyuthan District 
 Baspani, Sindhupalchowk District 
 Baspani, Gutu, Surkhet District 
 Baspani, Lagam, Surkhet District 
 Baspani, Syangja District 
 Baspani, Anbu Khaireni, Tanahun District 
 Baspani, Bandipur, Tanahun District 
 Baspani, Devghat, Tanahun District 
 Baspani, Terhathum District 
 Baspani, Udayapur District